Jorma Taitto (5 July 1917 – 6 January 2003) was a Finnish sports shooter. He competed in three events at the 1956 Summer Olympics.

References

External links
 

1917 births
2003 deaths
Finnish male sport shooters
Olympic shooters of Finland
Shooters at the 1956 Summer Olympics
People from Mäntsälä
Sportspeople from Uusimaa